is a Japanese light novel series written by Satori Tanabata with illustrations by Tea. It initially began serialization as a web novel published on the user-generated novel publishing site Shōsetsuka ni Narō in June 2018. It was then acquired by Fujimi Shobo who began publish to publish it as a light novel under their Kadokawa Books imprint in May 2019. A manga adaptation illustrated by Nokomi began serialization in Enterbrain's B's Log Comic magazine in February 2020.

Media

Light novel
Written by Satori Tanabata, the series began serialization as a web novel on the user-generated novel publishing website Shōsetsuka ni Narō on June 15, 2018. It was later acquired by Fujimi Shobo who began publishing it as a light novel with illustrations by Tea under their Kadokawa Books imprint on May 10, 2019. It has been collected in five volumes as of June 2022. The series is licensed in English by J-Novel Club.

Manga
A manga adaptation illustrated by Nokomi began serialization in Enterbrain's B's Log Comic magazine on February 5, 2020. It has been collected in three volumes as of February 2023. A voice comic adaptation of the manga featuring the voices of Fairouz Ai, Yuma Uchida and Azumi Waki was released on December 24, 2021.

References

External links
 
 
 

2019 Japanese novels
Anime and manga based on light novels
Enterbrain manga
Fantasy anime and manga
Fujimi Shobo
Isekai anime and manga
Isekai novels and light novels
J-Novel Club books
Japanese fantasy novels
Josei manga
Kadokawa Dwango franchises
Light novels
Light novels first published online
Shōsetsuka ni Narō